NH 125 may refer to:

 National Highway 125 (India)
 New Hampshire Route 125, United States